Baruch (Polish: Berek) is a masculine name among Jews used from Biblical times to the present, which is sometimes used as surname. It is also found, though more rarely, among Christians—particularly among Protestants who use Old Testament names. 

Except for its use as a name, this is also related to berakhah or bracha (Hebrew: ברכה; plural ברכות, berakhot), which is a Jewish blessing. See also: Baraka and Barakah.

The root B-R-K meaning "blessing" is also present in other Semitic languages. The most common Arabic form is the passive form Mubarak, but the form Barak (Barack) is also used. In Polish it is Berek.

Benedictus is a Latin name with similar meaning; cf. Baruch Spinoza or Benedictus de Spinoza.

People with the given name Baruch

Bible
 Baruch ben Neriah, aide to the prophet Jeremiah
 Baruch, son of Zabbai; one of Nehemiah's helpers in repairing the walls of Jerusalem 
 Baruch, son of Col-Hozeh; a member of the Tribe of Judah who settled in Jerusalem

Later times
 Baruch Agadati (1895–1976), Israeli painter, dancer, and film director
 Baruch Ben Haim (1921–2005), assistant chief rabbi of the Syrian Jewish community in Brooklyn, New York
 Baruch Blumberg (1925–2011), American Nobel Prize-winning physician, developed Hepatitis B vaccine
 Baruch Feinberg (born 1933), Israeli Olympic javelin thrower
 Baruch Goldstein (1956–1994), American-Israeli settler physician who murdered 29 Muslim worshipers in 1994
 Baruch Kurzweil (1907–1972), Israeli literary critic
 Baruch Levine (born 1977), American Orthodox Jewish singer-composer
 Baruch Ostrovsky (1890–1960), first mayor of Ra'anana, Israel
 Baruch Shemtov (born 1987), American journalist, television host, fashion designer, and entrepreneur
 Baruch Spinoza (1632–1677), Dutch rationalist philosopher
 Baruch Schleisinger Weil (1802–1893) American businessman and politician
 Baruch Steinberg (1897–1940), chief Rabbi of the Polish Army, victim of the Katyn massacre
 Baruch Zuckerman (1887–1970), American-Israeli zionist

Fictional characters
 The Baruch of Baghdad, the king of the Saracens in Wolfram von Eschenbach's Parzival
 Baruch, a fictional angel in the His Dark Materials series
 The real name of Billy Joe Cobra, of the television show Dude, That's My Ghost

References 

Given names